Altillac is a commune in the Corrèze department in the Nouvelle-Aquitaine region of central France.

The inhabitants of the commune are known as Altillacois or Altillacoises.

Geography

Altillac is a large commune located in the central massif of the Dordogne in eastern Nouvelle-Aquitaine (previously the smaller Limousin region until 2016), almost on the border with Occitania (previously Midi-Pyrénées). It was formerly called Xaintrie.

It is located some 30 km south-east of Brive-la-Gaillarde, 130 km south-west of Clermont-Ferrand, and about 180 km east of Bordeaux. Access to the commune is on road D940 which goes to the village just 1 km east of Beaulieu-sur-Dordogne then continues south through the commune to Biars-sur-Cère. The D116E branches south-east from this road to join the D14 east of Gagnac-sur-Cère. There is also the D116 coming from Brivezac in the north and the D41 highway to La Chapelle-Saint-Géraud in the north-east.

The Dordogne river forms the western boundary of the commune with some streams from the commune flowing into it including the Ruisseau du Suquet. The eastern border of the commune is formed by the Ruisseau d'Orges which flows south into the Ceres river. The northern border is formed by the Ruisseau de Chauvac which flows west into the Dordogne. The Ruisseau de Laumond on the eastern side also flows east into the Orges as does the Ruisseau de Malaval in the south.

There are quite a number of villages and hamlets in the commune. These are:

Andole
Courbignac
Esclaux
Fontmerle
Freyssignes
Gramond
Guilles
L'Aumond
L'Aussac
La Borderie
La Bourelle
La Majorie
La Palide
La Poujade
La Poulvélarie
La Veyssière
Le Rodal
Le Sagrier
Le Treil
Les Escures
Paliole
Siran

History
Altillac was the seat of a Viguerie under the Carolingian dynasty.

On 28 May 1942, the regional prefect of Limoges requisitioned land from the Chateau of Doux to create an internment centre for Jewish families.

Heraldry

Administration
List of Successive Mayors of Altillac:

Population

Culture and heritage

Civil heritage
The Chateau du Doux was built in 1904-1906 from plans by Jean-Louis Pascal. Influenced by the style used in Deauville, it is built in the style of Xaintrie, the nearest town, to serve as a luxury hotel. It is built above a valley and offers views of the surrounding landscape. Different styles are used for the window frames: simple windows, large curved bayss with stone latticework, cross windows, skylights, and capucine passantes. It used local materials to allow it to have a regional air: stones of various colours and a slate roof. Inside, the woodwork is Art Nouveau.
On the other side of the valley is the Doux domain where large farm buildings have been built: huge barns/stables on two levels with many barns built in imitation of small farms, which form a semblance of a hamlet, a henhouse, and a bread oven. All buildings - the hotel and the farm buildings - are certified as heritage of the 20th century.
The Dolmen de la Borderie - a Neolithic Dolmen in good condition.

Religious heritage
The Church of Saint-Etienne (14th century) is registered as an historical monument. It was built in 1528 except for the bell tower which dates back to the 14th century. The Church contains several items that are registered as historical objects:
A set of Baptismal fonts
Covers for the Baptismal fonts (1700)
Bowls for the Baptismal fonts (12th century)
The panelling in the Choir (1676)
6 Bas-reliefs (1676)
The panelling on the walls (1676)

Personalities
Notable personalities linked to the commune include:
Jean-Antoine Marbot, born 7 December 1754 in Altillac – 19 April 1800: French divisional general and politician. Father of generals Adolphe and Marcellin Marbot.
Adolphe Marbot, born 22 March 1781 in Altillac – 2 June 1844: French maréchal de camp (brigadier general).
Marcellin Marbot, born 18 August 1782 in Altillac – 16 November 1854: French lieutenant-général (divisional general), author of the famous Memoirs of General Marbot.
Marcel Conche, born 27 March 1922 in Altillac – 27 February 2022: French philosopher and professor emeritus of philosophy at the Sorbonne.

See also
Communes of the Corrèze department

References

External links
Altillac official website 
Altillac on the old National Geographic Institute website
Altillac on Géoportail, National Geographic Institute (IGN) website 
Altillac on the 1750 Cassini Map

Communes of Corrèze